The Ben Rebhuhn House was built in Great Neck Estates, New York in 1937. This home is the only home on Long Island designed by Frank Lloyd Wright at the request of Benjamin and Anne Rebhuhn, publishers of progressive content. This house is similar to the Ernest Vosburgh House in Grand Beach, Michigan, except that this house is in the Usonian style while the Vosburgh residence, built 21 years earlier, was in the Prairie style. The house follows a cruciform plan. The house features a two-story living room and is built from tidewater red cypress board and batten inside and out, with brick and red roof tile. Notable owners of the house have included Texas oil heiress Diane Reid.

References
 Storrer, William Allin. The Frank Lloyd Wright Companion. University Of Chicago Press, 2006,  (S.240)
 Seeberger, Tim. "Frank's Place: Lloyd Wright's Solo Long Island Project Remains At Ease With Itself" Long Island Press 9/20/2017

Frank Lloyd Wright buildings
Houses in Nassau County, New York
Houses completed in 1937